Ben Cooper is a former professional rugby league footballer who played in the 1990s and 2000s.

Club career
Ben Cooper played in 1999's Super League IV, 2000's Super League V, 2001's Super League VI, 2002's Super League VII, 2003's Super League VIII, 2004's Super League IX, and 2005's Super League X.

References

External links
Stanley Rangers ARLFC - Roll of Honour

1979 births
Living people
English rugby league players
Huddersfield Giants players
Leigh Leopards players
Place of birth missing (living people)
Rugby league centres
Rugby league fullbacks
Rugby league wingers
Sheffield Eagles (1984) players